Constance Morella (née Albanese; born February 12, 1931) is an American politician and diplomat. She represented  in the United States House of Representatives from 1987 to 2003. She served as Permanent Representative from the U.S. to the Organisation for Economic Co-operation and Development (OECD) from 2003 to 2007. She is on American University's faculty as an Ambassador in Residence for the Women & Politics Institute. She was appointed to the American Battle Monuments Commission (ABMC) by President Barack Obama in 2010.

Early life
She was born Constance Albanese in Somerville, Massachusetts. After graduating from Somerville High School in 1948, she attended Boston University, where she earned an Associate of Arts in 1950 and a Bachelor of Arts in 1954. Although she was raised in a family of blue-collar Democrats, she became a Republican after meeting Anthony C. Morella, who had worked for liberal Republicans John Lindsay, Nelson Rockefeller, Charles Mathias, and others. After they wed, the couple moved to Bethesda, Maryland.  After Connie Morella's sister died of cancer, Tony and Connie Morella adopted her six children to join their own three children.

Morella became a secondary school teacher in Montgomery County Public Schools in Maryland from 1957 to 1961. She graduated from American University with an M.A. in 1967 and was an instructor there from 1968 to 1970, when she became a professor at Montgomery College in Rockville, Maryland. She continued to teach until 1985, when she left teaching to fully focus on her political career.

Political career 
In 1971 Morella was appointed as a founding member to the Montgomery County Commission for Women, an advisory women's advocacy body, and she was elected its president in 1973. She became active in the League of Women Voters. In 1974, she ran for the Maryland House of Delegates from the 16th District (Bethesda), but did not win. She ran again in 1978, winning the seat and receiving more votes than the three previous incumbents. She was reelected for an additional term, before running for United States Congress.

Congressional career
In 1986, Morella ran for the open Congressional seat in Maryland's 8th congressional district. The district was being vacated by Democrat Michael Barnes, who was running for the Democratic nomination to the U.S. Senate. Morella's opponent in the general election was State Senator Stewart Bainum, a multimillionaire business executive who consistently outpolled her throughout most of the campaign.

A major turning point came when Morella unexpectedly won endorsements from The Baltimore Sun and The Washington Post, an unusual feat for a Republican candidate in the race for an open Congressional seat in Maryland. Many analysts credit the endorsements for Morella's narrow victory in November. She was the first woman to hold this seat. Although she was a Republican in an area that had become heavily Democratic, she proved highly popular among her constituents and won re-election seven times, serving until 2002.

Morella opposes her party's positions on abortion, gun control, gay rights, and the environmental movement, voted for government funding of contraceptives and needle exchange programs for drug addicts, and favored the legalization of medical marijuana. She received some support from organized labor and opposed many tax cuts. Morella, however, voted against President Clinton's 1993 budget, as all other Congressional Republicans did. She voted against declaring English the official language of the United States and, in 1996, against a bill overwhelmingly approved by Congress and signed by President Bill Clinton to combat illegal immigration.

In 1996, Morella was one of only five Republicans to vote against the Cuban Liberty and Democratic Solidarity Act. In 1998, she was one of only three Republicans to vote against renaming the Washington National Airport the Ronald Reagan Washington National Airport. Morella was the only Republican in the entire Congress to have voted against approving the use of military force in Iraq in 1991 and again in 2002. She was active in human rights, women's health, and domestic violence issues in Congress, and served on the Science and Government Reform Committees.

Morella was U.S. representative to the 1994 U.N. International Conference on Population and Development in Cairo and co-chair of the Congressional delegation to the 1995 U.N. Fourth World Conference on Women in Beijing. Among the legislation she sponsored were the 1992 Battered Women's Testimony Act, which provided funds for indigent women to hire expert testimony in domestic abuse cases, and the Judicial Training Act, which funded programs to educate judges about domestic violence, especially in child custody cases.

Morella came under greater pressure after her party took control of the House in 1994 Congressional elections. Although she signed the Contract with America developed by Newt Gingrich, she had a mixed record supporting the subsequent Republican majority in Congress. She did not openly challenge the new House leadership until 1997 when she voted "present" for Speaker of the House instead of for the incumbent, Newt Gingrich. In 1998, she was one of four Republicans, along with Amo Houghton and Peter T. King of New York and Chris Shays of Connecticut, to oppose all four articles of impeachment against Clinton during the Lewinsky scandal.

As a Republican representing an affluent Democratic district in an increasingly Democratic state, Morella faced a succession of increasingly strong Democratic challengers.  While she managed to fend them all off, even in the big Democratic years of 1992, 1996, and 1998, the low popularity of the Republican-controlled Congress gradually undermined her. She tried to portray herself as giving her district a place at the table, but over time, Morella's Democratic opponents claimed that a vote for Morella was a vote to keep Tom DeLay and other Republicans unpopular to district voters in power.

Electoral challenges
Maryland Senate President Thomas V. "Mike" Miller stated that he intended to draw Morella's district out from under her after her relatively narrow reelection in 2000. The Democrats controlled both the State Legislature and the Governor's Office in 2000, thus controlling the redistricting for the 2000 Census. Staffers from Senate President Miller, House Speaker Cas Taylor, and Governor Parris Glendening drew new maps to gerrymander out Morella and fellow moderate Republican Bob Ehrlich. One proposal went so far as to divide her district in two, effectively giving one to State Senator Chris Van Hollen and forcing Morella to run against popular Delegate and Kennedy political family member Mark Shriver.

The final redistricting plan was less ambitious but still made the already heavily Democratic 8th district even more Democratic. It restored a heavily Democratic spur of eastern Montgomery County removed in the 1990 redistricting and added nine precincts in Prince George's County from Al Wynn's heavily Democratic . Although it forced Van Hollen and Shriver to run against each other in an expensive primary, Van Hollen defeated Morella in 2002 with 52 percent of the vote to Morella's 47 percent (Morella would have narrowly won re-election in her previous district, according to election returns). Proving just how Democratic this new district is, the Republicans have only put up nominal challengers in the 8th since Morella's defeat; none of them have ever won more than 40 percent of the vote.

In 2013, Morella signed an amicus curiae brief submitted to the Supreme Court in support of same-sex marriage during the Hollingsworth v. Perry case.

Morella publicly endorsed former Vice President Joe Biden, a Democrat, in the 2020 US Presidential election, over Republican incumbent Donald Trump.

Ambassador to the OECD
President George W. Bush appointed her United States Permanent Representative to the Organisation for Economic Co-operation and Development (OECD) on July 11, 2003.

She was unanimously confirmed by the United States Senate on July 31 and sworn in on October 8 of that year, becoming the first former member of Congress to serve as ambassador to the OECD. She is an honorary board member of the National Organization of Italian American Women who declared Morella a Feminina Excelente.

She officially served as Ambassador from August 1, 2003 to August 6, 2007.  In November 2007, she was succeeded by Christopher Egan, son of Richard Egan.

Awards and honors
Morella has received honorary doctorates from American University, 1988; Norwich University, 1989; Dickinson College, 1989; Mt. Vernon College, 1995; University of Maryland University College, 1996; University of Maryland, 1997; Uniformed Services University of the Health Sciences, 1997; Elizabethtown College, 1999; Washington College, 2000; and National Labor College, 2004.

Her numerous awards and recognitions include induction into the Maryland Women's Hall of Fame, the Ron Brown Standards Leadership Award, and public service awards from the American Medical Association, the American Bar Association, and the Hubert H. Humphrey Civil Rights Award from the Leadership Conference on Civil Rights "for selfless and devoted service in the cause of equality." The Republic of Italy awarded her the Medal of the Legion of Merit. She received the Foremother Award by The National Center for Health Research in 2008.

In 2013, she was awarded the Knight Commander's Cross of the Order of Merit of the Federal Republic of Germany for putting "energy and enthusiasm into growing the Congressional Study Group on Germany, which is the oldest and most active parliamentary exchange involving Congress and the legislative branch of another country" during her tenure as President of the United States Association of Former Members of Congress.

In 2016, she was conferred with Imperial Decorations by the Japanese government. For her contributions to deepen the U.S.-Japan alliance in the U.S. Congress, she was awarded with the Order of the Rising Sun, Gold and Silver Star.

On April 14, 2018, the Bethesda Library branch of the Montgomery County Public Libraries system was renamed the Connie Morella Library.

Electoral history

*Write-in and minor candidate notes:  In 1996, write-ins received 379 votes.  In 2000, Lih Young received 77 votes; write-ins received 275 votes; and Scott Walker received 19 votes.

See also
 Victor Kamkin Bookstore – a Rockville, Maryland bookstore which Morella sought to save from bankruptcy
 Women in the United States House of Representatives

References

External links 

 Constance A. Morella papers at the University of Maryland Libraries
 American University faculty profile
 

|-

|-

|-

|-

1931 births
21st-century American politicians
21st-century American women politicians
Ambassadors of the United States to the Organisation for Economic Co-operation and Development
American people of Italian descent
American University alumni
American women ambassadors
Boston University alumni
Female members of the United States House of Representatives
Italian-American culture in Maryland
Knights Commander of the Order of Merit of the Federal Republic of Germany
Recipients of the Order of the Rising Sun, 2nd class
Living people
Republican Party members of the Maryland House of Delegates
People from Bethesda, Maryland
Politicians from Somerville, Massachusetts
Republican Party members of the United States House of Representatives from Maryland
Women state legislators in Maryland